Sapahi may refer to:

 Sapahi, Dhanusha, Nepal
 Sapahi, Bara, Nepal